Mezhdusopochny is a snow-capped shield volcano in the central Kamchatka Peninsula. The volcano has shown rare activity since 1292. The volcano's proximity is covered with other volcanoes and cinder cones.

See also
List of volcanoes in Russia

References

Volcanoes of the Kamchatka Peninsula
Shield volcanoes of Russia
Pleistocene shield volcanoes
Pleistocene Asia